Frank Smith (1849February 13, 1921) was an American dentist and Republican politician from Madison, Wisconsin.  He was a member of the Wisconsin State Assembly, representing central Dane County during the 1909 session.

Biography
Frank Smith was born in Ripley, Tennessee, in 1849.  At age 17, just after the conclusion of the American Civil War, he enlisted in the United States Army and served a three-year term of enlistment.  After his honorable discharge, he purchased a farm in Green County, Wisconsin.  He remained on the farm for only a few years, then spent four years working as a traveling salesman.  Beginning in the late 1870s, he worked for nine years as an engineer for the Wisconsin State Capitol in Madison, Wisconsin.

He then moved to Chicago, where he entered the Chicago College of Dental Surgery, graduating in 1894.  He practiced for several years as a dentist in Chicago before returning to Madison in 1901.

In 1902, he was elected to the Madison city council, running on the Republican ticket.  He was re-elected in 1904.

In 1908, he ran for Wisconsin State Assembly under the new Primary election system.  He prevailed in the primary over two opponents, including the last Republican representative of the district—Ernest Warner.  He went on to win the general election with 43% of the vote, defeating the incumbent Democrat Elmore Elver. He served during the 49th Wisconsin Legislature and ran for re-election in 1910, but was defeated in the Republican primary by Madison physician Cornelius A. Harper.

Smith died at his home in downtown Madison, Wisconsin, on February 3, 1921, after suffering a year of illness.

Electoral history

Wisconsin Assembly (1908, 1910)

| colspan="6" style="text-align:center;background-color: #e9e9e9;"| Republican Primary, September 8, 1908

| colspan="6" style="text-align:center;background-color: #e9e9e9;"| General Election, November 3, 1908

| colspan="6" style="text-align:center;background-color: #e9e9e9;"| Republican Primary, September 6, 1910

References

1849 births
Date of birth missing
1921 deaths
People from Ripley, Tennessee
Politicians from Madison, Wisconsin
Republican Party members of the Wisconsin State Assembly
American dentists
United States Army soldiers
20th-century American politicians